Cassandra Ann Randolph (born April 27, 1995) is an American television personality who came to national prominence in 2019, as the winner of season 23 of The Bachelor, starring Colton Underwood.

Early life and education
Randolph was born in Orange County, California to parents Matt Randolph and Amy McCleary. She is the eldest of three siblings; her younger siblings include Michelle, an actress and model signed to Wilhelmina Models, and Landon. Randolph grew up in Walnut Creek, California, where she graduated from Berean Christian High School; Randolph then attended Biola University, graduating with a degree in communication sciences and disorders in 2016. She then began working as a substitute ESL teacher at the Huntington Beach Union High School District. She is scheduled to graduate with a master's degree in speech pathology from the University of Wisconsin–Eau Claire in 2021.

Career
Randolph began her career in reality television in 2016, appearing in the reality web series Young Once. The series follows Christian students in Southern California studying at Biola University, a conservative evangelical university that enforces abstinence-only rules and bans alcohol and drugs. Season two of the web series began airing at the same time as The Bachelor.

In 2018, Randolph was cast in season 23 of The Bachelor, starring former professional football player Colton Underwood. Filming for the season took place throughout fall 2018, and Randolph was later revealed by ABC as a contestant on December 6, 2018. In the episode which aired on March 4, 2019, Randolph quit the competition after realizing she did not feel ready to become engaged at the end of the season; Randolph breaking up with Underwood caused him to commit the "fence jump", which was heavily reported in the media. Randolph later rejoined the season in the following episode, after Underwood revealed to her that he would not propose and had broken up with other finalists Tayshia Adams and Hannah Godwin to be with her. At the live After the Final Rose special airing on March 12, Underwood and Randolph confirmed that they were in a relationship.

Personal life
Randolph dated Connor Cabral from Berean and then professional basketball player Caelan Tiongson for five years. Randolph was in a relationship with Bachelor star Colton Underwood from November 2018 to May 2020. On September 11, 2020, Randolph filed a restraining order against Underwood, alleging that he stalked her outside her Los Angeles apartment and her parents' Huntington Beach house, that he sent harassing text messages using an anonymous number, and that he installed a tracking device underneath her car. At an October 6 hearing, the restraining order was extended by the judge until further court proceedings on November 6. The same day, Randolph proceeded to file a police report concerning the tracking device installed on her car, alleging that Underwood had planted it.

Filmography

References

External links

1995 births
American Christians
Bachelor Nation contestants
Biola University alumni
Living people
People from Huntington Beach, California
University of Wisconsin–Eau Claire alumni
Reality show winners